Scott County High School is a public high school in Georgetown, Kentucky, United States. The mascot is a Cardinal. School colors are Red and Blue, with white and black occasionally serving as secondary colors. In the 2018–19 school year, its last as the county's only public high school, the combined institution had an enrollment of 2,486, making it the largest high school in the state, before rival school Great Crossing High School opened across town just in time for the 2019-2020 school year. The 9th Grade Center, a section of the building where all of the 9th grade classes were located, along with a separate library, cafeteria, and gym, was replaced by the new "Phoenix Horizon" (formerly called Cardinal Academy when the section of the school was  the 9th Grade Center) a program where kids who were struggling in normal classes, or having behavior issues could go and learn without the distractions of a normal classroom.

History
With Scott County being the fastest-growing in the state during the last half of the 2010s, and with more than 3,000 high school students expected by the 2020–21 school year, the county school district began construction on the new Great Crossing High School next to the ECS campus in 2017. The new school opened for the 2019–20 school year with space for over 1,900 students. Initially, rising juniors and seniors for 2019–20, plus any of their siblings who were set to attend a Scott County high school in that school year, would have been allowed to remain at Scott County High if they wished. The district later changed its plans, allowing all students who were set to attend a district high school to choose their school; about 55% chose to attend Great Crossing. Before the plans of opening a new high school, Scott County was going to be renovated to repair parts of the school, and extend it to occupy more students. However, these plans were scrapped and instead a new high school was built.

Athletics
 Basketball (separate boys and girls)
 Cheerleading squad 
 Cross country team (separate boys and girls)
 Football (boys only)
 Golf (separate boys and girls)
 Soccer (separate boys and girls)
 Softball (girls only)
 Tennis  (separate boys and girls)
 Track (separate boys and girls)
 Trap Shooting (co-ed)
 Volleyball (girls only)
 Swimming (co-ed)
 Dance Team (girls only)
 Baseball (boys only)
 Lacrosse (separate boys and girls)
 Wrestling
 Bowling (boys and girls)
 Archery (co-ed)
 E-Sports

Athletic accomplishments
-Powerlifting
1999 Kentucky State Champions
-Basketball
2007 Kentucky Boys State Champion
(30-0 against in state teams)
(4-2 against out of state teams)
(Defeated #1 ranked Huntington High School)
2007 Ranked 15th in the nation in the final USA Today Polls
1998 Kentucky Boys State Champion
1995 Kentucky Girls State Champion

-Football
2013 Kentucky 6A State Champions 15-0
2010 Regional Champions
2009 Regional Champions
2006 JV Pride Champions 10-0
2006 Kentucky Freshman Bluegrass Champions 9-0
1975 Kentucky 2A State Champions

-Boys Soccer
2006 District Champions
2005 Regional Champions
2006 Regional Champions
2008 Regional Champions

-Boys Tennis
1987 Regional Champions
1999 Regional Champions
1997 Regional Champions

-Boys Bowling
2012 Regional Champions
2012 State Champions
2013 Regional Champions

-Girls Softball
2007 Regional Champs
2008 Regional Champs
2010 Regional Champs
2011 District Champs
2012 District Champs
2013 District Champs
2012 Regional Champs
2013 Regional Champs
2014 Regional Champs
2014 State Champs
2015 Regional Champs
2016 State Champs
2018 Regional Champs
2018 State Champs

-Archery
2016 World Championship Qualifiers
2017 World Championship Qualifiers

Academics
Scott County High School has the following academic departments:
 Agriculture
 Art
 Band
 Business
 Choir
 Civil Law
 Criminal Law
 Language Arts
 Family and Consumer Science
 Foreign Language Classes
 Law and Justice
 Health and Physical Education
 Health Services
 Math
 Industrial Technology
 Science
 Social Studies
 Special Education
 Journalism/School Newspaper
 Engineering
 Biomedical Science

Scott County High School offers a number of AP classes:
 English Literature
 English Language
 United States History
 World History
 Human Geography
 Psychology
 Biology
 Calculus (AB and BC)
 French Language
 Japanese Language
 Spanish Language
 Art
 Environmental Science
 Chemistry
 Statistics
 Physics B

There are also Dual Credit classes that are available to take, and Co-OP opportunities.

Each day has 6 periods, including a Language Arts, Math, Social Studies, and a Science class (if students already have all 3 of their Science and/or Social Studies credits, they can choose an elective in its place). There is also an option to take an Early Morning class, and there are tutoring and Saturday School options available. Each student is allowed to pick two electives, and in the middle of the day students have a study hall like class called "Card Time". Each student gets to pick which Card Time they want to be in for each semester. Different Card Times include activities like running and crafts, all the way to watching movies and playing games. Students who need RTI do so at this time. Students are required to take a Financial Literacy class, most students take care of it in one of the semesters during Card Time.

Students are required to have 4 Math and Language Arts credits, 3 Science and Social Studies credits, at least 1 Art credit (classes like Art, Band and Choir give Art credits), and at least 1 Health credit and at least 1 Physical Education class (there are classes available to earn these credits, ranging from Strength and Conditioning to Weight Lifting).

Music

Band
The band director is Lindsay King. Former band directors include Greg Stepp.
 Symphonic Winds (top concert band)
 Concert Winds
 Beginning Band
 Intro to Band
 Jazz Band I
 Jazz Band II
 Marching Band (all band members participate, but it is not a competing band)
 Red Pep Band
 Blue Pep Band

Each year the Band performs at Assessment, parades, Football and Basket Ball games, and has concerts. Students each year audition and are accepted into various Honor Bands, and KMEA Allstate.

In April 2007, the Symphonic Winds performed at Carnegie Hall in New York City. In 2007, Scott County High School Band was named the largest high school or college band in Kentucky. In May 2009, the Band when to Atlanta, Georgia to compete in the Dixie Classic Festival where they ranked Distinguished on a National level. In February 2010, The Symphonic Winds 4th hour band played at the KMEA yearly convention in Louisville, Kentucky. In April 2010, the band went to the Dixie Classic Festival in Chicago, the Symphonic Winds being named Honor Band. The Symphonic Winds 4th hour band was invited to play in the Chicago Midwest Band Festival in 2010.

Choral
The choral department. 
 Singers (choral ensemble)
 Chorus (bottom coed choral ensemble)
 Mastersingers (top men's ensemble)
 Ladies' Ensemble (top women's ensemble)
 Chamber Singers

The choir has concerts each year, along with performing in various parades, and graduation. Students participate in the Musical Productions the school puts on every year. Each year students in the choir audition and are accepted in choirs such as KMEA Allstate, ACDA, and other programs.

Other accomplishments

Kentucky United Nations Assembly
2018- 
Outstanding Resolution Award- #51 Ethiopia- Amending the Universal Declaration of Human Rights to add Article 31 "The Right to Refuse to Kill" 
Outstanding Resolution Award- #53 Guatemala- Convention to Build Communal Compost Toilets And Educating Proper Hygiene 
Endorsed by Secretary General- #52 Fiji- Instituting Protections for Climate Refugees
Endorsed by Secretary General- #54 Nigeria- An Act to Establish Protections Against Extraterrestrial Beings
Outstanding Speaker Award- 
Outstanding Ambassador Award-
Summit Chairs-

HOSA State Leadership Conference:

1st Place, Creative Problem Solving

HOSA National Leadership Conference
2005-
 1st Place, Extemporaneous Writing
 
2010-
 2nd place Biomedical Debate

2011-
1st place Biomedical Debate

STLP (Student Technology Leadership Program)
2003-
State Recognition, Regional Blue Ribbon - High School Virtual Tour

2004-
State Recognition, Regional Blue Ribbon - High School Virtual Tour

Footnotes

References

Buildings and structures in Georgetown, Kentucky
Public high schools in Kentucky
Schools in Scott County, Kentucky
Educational institutions established in 1955
1955 establishments in Kentucky